Gordon Aschroft (7 September 1902 – after 1930) was an English professional footballer who played as a goalkeeper. Born in Lea, Lancashire, he played for Coppull Central before joining Football League First Division side Burnley in November 1925. He made his debut for the club on 7 December 1925 in the 3–1 win against Birmingham at Turf Moor. Ashcroft failed to make another first-team appearance for Burnley and was released at the end of the 1926–27 season. In August 1927 he signed for Burscough Rangers, and then played for Lancaster Town.

References

1902 births
Year of death missing
Footballers from Preston, Lancashire
English footballers
Association football goalkeepers
Coppull Central F.C. players
Burnley F.C. players
Burscough F.C. players
Lancaster City F.C. players
English Football League players